The fourth season of the CBS police procedural series The Mentalist premiered on September 22, 2011 and concluded on May 17, 2012. The season picks up immediately after the events of the third-season finale in which Patrick Jane (Simon Baker) was arrested for the public murder of the man he believes is the notorious serial killer Red John, who murdered his wife and daughter.

Cast

Main cast 
 Simon Baker as Patrick Jane (24 episodes)
 Robin Tunney as Teresa Lisbon (24 episodes)
 Tim Kang as Kimball Cho (24 episodes)
 Owain Yeoman as Wayne Rigsby (24 episodes)
 Amanda Righetti as Grace Van Pelt (24 episodes)

Recurring cast 
 Michael Rady as Luther Wainwright (9 episodes)
 Samaire Armstrong as Summer Edgecombe (7 episodes)
 Catherine Dent as Susan Darcy (6 episodes)
 Jillian Bach as Sarah Harrigan (4 episodes)
 Michael Gaston as Gale Bertram (2 episodes)
 Alicia Witt as Rosalind Harker (2 episodes)

Notable guest cast 
 Reed Diamond as Ray Haffner  ("Little Red Book") 
 Pruitt Taylor Vince as J. J. LaRoche ("Little Red Book")
 Henry Thomas as Tommy Lisbon ("Where in the World is Carmine O'Brien?")
 Missi Pyle as Karen Cross ("Blinking Red Light")
 David Paymer as James Panzer ("Blinking Red Light")
 Eric Winter as Craig O'Laughlin (ghost) ("My Bloody Valentine")
 Joaquim de Almeida as Gabriel Porchetto ("My Bloody Valentine")
 James Frain as Terry Murphy  ("At First Blush") 
 David Norona as Osvaldo Ardiles  ("At First Blush") 
 Morena Baccarin as Erica Flynn ("War of the Roses")
 Malcolm McDowell as Bret Stiles ("His Thoughts Were Red Thoughts")
 Vincent Martella as Martin Klubock ("Something's Rotten in Redmund")
 William R. Moses as Archie Bloom Sr. ("Ruby Slippers")
 Ray Wise as Dennis Victor ("Red Rover, Red Rover")
 Emmanuelle Chriqui as Lorelei Martins ("The Crimson Hat")

Episodes

U.S. ratings

Production 
Speaking of the season, creator Bruno Heller said, "Every season, you kind of take a chance to reset things. ... Last season was almost serialized. There was a great deal of plot and story that you could follow through the whole season. We're going to need less of that this season." He commented that the new season would explore Jane's feelings about finally catching his "white whale", Red John: "What does revenge mean? Because, as you saw in that final moment, after you've killed someone, what's left? ... That kind of bitterness and hate kills things. But then, what do you do?"

DVD release 
All 24 episodes were included in the five disc complete fourth season set. It was released on September 18, 2012 in Region 1, October 8, 2012 in Region 2, and November 7, 2012 in Region 4. It included the featurette "CBI: Behind the Badge".

References

External links 
 
 
 

2011 American television seasons
2012 American television seasons
The Mentalist seasons